Homeland's Gratitude Medal is the 19th most important medal in the Croatian honours system.

The Homeland's Gratitude Medal has four classes, each for the length of service of 5, 10, 15, and 20 or more years.

Notable recipients 
 Imra Agotić
 Mate Boban
 Branimir Glavaš (Revoked for charges of war crimes)
 Frane Vinko Golem
 Ante Kotromanović
 Zvonko Kusić
 Slobodan Lang
 Sveto Letica
 Drago Lovrić
 Josip Lucić
 Predrag Matić
 Rudolf Perešin
 Predrag Stipanović
 Petar Stipetić
 Mirko Šundov
 Franjo Tuđman

References 

Orders, decorations, and medals of Croatia
Awards established in 1995
1995 establishments in Croatia